Shaverdi (also Romanized as Shāverdī) is a village in Salami Rural District, Khanafereh District, Shadegan County, Khuzestan Province, Iran. At the 2006 census, its population was 1,584, in 285 families.

References 

Populated places in Shadegan County